Susan Kelk Cervantes (née Susan Elizabeth Kelk; born 1944) is an American artist who has been at the epicenter of the San Francisco mural movement and the co-founder and executive director of the community-based non-profit, Precita Eyes Muralists.

Personal life and education 

Susan Elizabeth Kelk graduated high school a year early in Dallas, Texas to attend art school at the age of 16. Since her parents could not help pay her tuition after losing their floral and nursery business Kelk accepted a scholarship from the Dallas Museum of Art and attended the San Francisco School of Fine Arts, (now known as the San Francisco Art Institute or SFAI). Kelk received her Bachelor of Fine Arts in 1965 and Master of Fine Arts in 1968 from SFAI. 

In her first year of college in the 1960s, Kelk met her husband and collaborator, Luis Cervantes (1924–2005). They had three sons together.

Career
Susan Cervantes is considered a leader in the Mission District community mural movement and considers herself a community artist responsible for over 400 murals. Cervantes was introduced to murals through Diego Rivera's The Making of a Fresco Showing the Building of a City (1931) at Diego Rivera Gallery and was inspired by and then joined the Mujeres Muralistas in the early 1970s. She was asked to help paint with the Mujeres Muralistas at Paco's Tacos, a restaurant on the corner of 24th and South Van Ness, which marks the moment she lost interest in her studio work on canvas. Though Cervantes was not Chicana her work was strongly influenced by and sensitive to the Chicano art movement.

Later, Susan began volunteering as an art teacher at the Precita Valley Community Center where her Thursday night painting workshop quickly became a mural workshop. The class did not have a wall to teach on, so they painted on five plywood panels, totaling 20 feet when assembled. That mural, named Masks of God, Soul of Man was the first and only mural Susan created that didn't have a wall waiting for it, meaning that "Walls come to [her]" and that her work is all currently by request. It was displayed in the Bernal Heights Library and was debuted as the work of the Precita Eyes Muralists. Susan and Luis founded the Precita Eyes Mural Arts Center in 1977. Precita Eyes has been recognized for creating public art that reflects its community's history and culture. One of only three community mural centers in the United States, Precita Eyes sponsors and implements ongoing mural projects throughout the Bay Area and internationally. Some of her notable work has appeared at the MaestraPeace mural on the Women's Building, Clarion Alley Mural Project, Chicano Art: Resistance and Affirmation, Balmy Alley and on the Northeastern University Latinx Student Cultural Center.

Precita Eyes has participated in many of the murals that are in San Francisco's historic Mission District neighborhood, known for the murals that cover the walls of many buildings in the neighborhood. They collaborate with schools in the community, as well as other youth programs, to allow youth artists to plan and execute their own mural design at their school or local building. Precita Eyes partners with mural artists to teach technique and creative thinking to the students that they work with, making sure that they have guidance but the freedom to create a mural that is meaningful to them and their community. Also among their slew of  programs is a toddler art class, support for young student artists through exhibitions of their work, and providing educational tours of the murals in the neighborhood.

References

1944 births
American muralists
Women muralists
Artists from San Francisco
San Francisco Art Institute alumni
Living people
20th-century American painters
20th-century American women artists
21st-century American painters
21st-century American women artists
Painters from California